Haizhou Li is a professor at the National University of Singapore, Singapore. He was named Fellow of the Institute of Electrical and Electronics Engineers (IEEE) in 2014 for leadership in multilingual speaker and language recognition. He was the Editor-in-Chief of IEEE/ACM Transactions on Audio, Speech and Language Processing from 2015 to 2018. He received the President's Technology Award Singapore in 2013.

References 

Fellow Members of the IEEE
Living people
Year of birth missing (living people)
Place of birth missing (living people)